Events in the year 1238 in Norway.

Incumbents
Monarch: Haakon IV Haakonsson

Events

Arts and literature

Births
Magnus VI of Norway, king (died 1280).

Deaths

References

Norway